Eudorina is a paraphyletic genus in the volvocine green algae clade. Eudorina colonies consist of 16, 32 or 64 individual cells grouped together. Each individual cell contains flagella which allow the colony to move as a whole when the individual cells beat their flagella together.  Description by GM Smith (1920, p 95):

Description 
Eudorina colonies typically consist of 16, 32 or 64 cells, each of which is similar to Chlamydomonas reinhardtii. These cells are bedded within an extracellular matrix composed of glycoproteins. Colonies are spherical and motile, with motility derived from the flagellated individual cells. Eudorina is facultatively sexual, meaning colonies can reproduce either sexually or asexually. During development, each Chlamydomonas-like cell undergoes several rounds of division to form plakeas, which then invert to form daughter colonies before hatching out of the mother colony.

References

External links
 Eudorina - Description with pictures
Yamada, T.Y, Miyaja,K. and Nisayoshi, N. 2008. A taxonomic study of Eudorina unicocca (Volvocaceae, Chlorophyceae) and related species, based on morphology and molecular phylogeny. Eur. L.Phycol. 43: 317 - 326.

Chlamydomonadales
Chlamydomonadales genera